Home Invasion is a 2016 American thriller film, directed by David Tennant. It stars Jason Patric, Scott Adkins, Natasha Henstridge, William Dickinson, Kyra Zagorsky and Michael Rogers.

Cast

 Natasha Henstridge as Chloe
 Jason Patric as Mike
 Kyra Zagorsky as Knox
 Liam Dickinson as Jacob
 Michael Rogers as Astor
 Christian Tessier as Xander
 Brenda M. Crichlow as Bess
 Scott Adkins as Heflin

Release
The film had its world premiere on February 2, 2016.

See also
 List of films featuring home invasions

References

External links
 
 

2016 thriller films
American thriller films
Home invasions in film
2010s English-language films
2010s American films